Geoffrey Charles Chinedu (born 1 October 1997) is a Nigerian footballer who plays as a forward for Radnički 1923 Kragujevac.

Career

In 2015, Chinedu signed for Northern Cypriot side Doğan Türk Birliği, before joining the youth academy of KF Skënderbeu in the Albanian top flight. In October 2016, he also went on a trial at Czech club FK Teplice.

Before the second half of 2016/17, he was sent on loan to Albanian second division club Besa, where he made 7 league appearances and scored 1 goal.

In 2017, Chinedu signed for Rabotnički in North Macedonia.

In 2019, he signed for Romanian second division team Turris Turnu Măgurele. After that, he signed for Olimpik (Donetsk) in Ukraine.

Before the 2020 season, Chinedu was sent on loan to Estonian outfit Narva Trans before leaving that December.

In 2021, Chinedu was sent on loan to FC Lahti with an option to buy.

At the end of 2022, Geoffrey joined Serbian Superliga side Radnički Kragujevac. A team in central Serbia, as a free transfer.

References

External links
 
 

Living people
1997 births
Nigerian footballers
Nigerian expatriate footballers
Association football forwards
Sportspeople from Lagos
Doğan Türk Birliği footballers
KF Besa Kavajë players
KF Skënderbeu Korçë players
FC Lahti players
FC Olimpik Donetsk players
JK Narva Trans players
FK Rabotnički players
AFC Turris-Oltul Turnu Măgurele players
Meistriliiga players
Macedonian First Football League players
Ukrainian Premier League players
Veikkausliiga players
Kategoria e Parë players
Expatriate footballers in Albania
Expatriate footballers in Northern Cyprus
Expatriate footballers in Estonia
Expatriate footballers in Finland
Expatriate footballers in North Macedonia
Expatriate footballers in Romania
Expatriate footballers in Ukraine
Nigerian expatriate sportspeople in Albania
Nigerian expatriate sportspeople in Northern Cyprus
Nigerian expatriate sportspeople in Estonia
Nigerian expatriate sportspeople in Finland
Nigerian expatriate sportspeople in North Macedonia
Nigerian expatriate sportspeople in Romania
Nigerian expatriate sportspeople in Ukraine